William Dench (christened 16 April 1797) was an English cricketer who played for Sussex. He was born in Horsham.

Dench made a single first-class appearance for the team, during the 1826 season. Batting as a tailender, he scored 0 not out and 2 runs in the two innings in which he batted, as his Sussex team finished with a first innings total of just 23 all out.

External links
William Dench at Cricket Archive

1797 births
English cricketers
Sussex cricketers
Year of death missing
English cricketers of 1826 to 1863